Town End Farmhouse is an historic building in the English parish of Stalmine-with-Staynall, Lancashire. It was built in 1694. A farmhouse, it is in brick with a thatched roof covered in corrugated asbestos.  It has one-and-a-half storeys and two bays.  The windows have plain reveals; some of them are sashes, others are modern.  Above the doorway is an inscribed plaque, and inside the house is an encased bressumer.

See also
Listed buildings in Stalmine-with-Staynall

References

Notes

1694 establishments in England
Houses completed in 1694
Grade II listed buildings in Lancashire
Houses in Lancashire
Farmhouses in England
Buildings and structures in the Borough of Wyre